Versigny may refer to the following places in France:

 Versigny, Aisne, a commune in the department of Aisne
 Versigny, Oise, a commune in the department of Oise